Arnold Rifkin is an American film producer.  He founded Cheyenne Enterprises in 1999.  Rifkin has produced a number of films that star Bruce Willis such as The Whole Ten Yards (2004), Hostage (2005), 16 Blocks (2006) and Live Free or Die Hard (2007), the latter of which he served as an executive producer.

Select filmography
He was a producer in all films unless otherwise noted.

Film

Thanks

Television

References

External links
 

Living people
American film producers
Year of birth missing (living people)